Conasprella jaspidea, common name the Jasper cone, is a species of sea snail, a small cone snail, a marine gastropod mollusk in the family Conidae, the cone snails and their allies.

Like all species within the genus Conasprella, these cone snails are predatory and venomous. They are capable of "stinging" humans, therefore live ones should be handled carefully or not at all.

Subspecies
 Conasprella jaspidea jaspidea (Gmelin, 1791)
 Conasprella jaspidea pealii Green, 1830

Synonyms
 Conasprella (Ximeniconus) jaspidea (Gmelin, 1791) accepted, alternate representation
 Conus acutimarginatus G. B. Sowerby II, 1866
 Conus corrugatus G. B. Sowerby II, 1870
 Conus crebrisulcatus G. B. Sowerby II, 1857
 Conus exumaensis (Petuch, 2013)
 Conus jaspideus f. acutimarginatus G. B. Sowerby II, 1866 (unavailable name: infrasubspecific rank)
 Conus jaspideus jaspideus Gmelin, 1791
 Conus oleiniki (Petuch, 2013)
 Conus sulcatus Mühlfeld, 1816
 Jaspidiconus acutimarginatus (G. B. Sowerby II, 1866)
 Jaspidiconus exumaensis Petuch, 2013
 Jaspidiconus jaspideus (Gmelin, 1791) 
 Jaspidiconus jaspideus f. acutimarginatus (G. B. Sowerby II, 1866)
 Jaspidiconus jaspideus jaspideus (Gmelin, 1791)
 Jaspidiconus oleiniki Petuch, 2013

Distribution
This marine species occurs in the Gulf of Mexico and in the Caribbean Sea (off Guadeloupe); in the Atlantic Ocean off Northern Brasil.

Description 
The maximum recorded shell length is 30 mm.

Habitat 
The minimum recorded depth for this species is 0 m; maximum recorded depth is 97 m.

References

 Sowerby, G.B. II. (1870). Descriptions of Forty-eight new Species of Shells. Proc. Zool. Soc. London. (1870): 249–259
 Puillandre N., Duda T.F., Meyer C., Olivera B.M. and Bouchet P. (2015). One, four or 100 genera? A new classification of the cone snails. Journal of Molluscan Studies. 81: 1–23

External links
 The Conus Biodiversity website
 Cone Shells – Knights of the Sea
 
 Specimen in MNHN, Paris

jaspidea
Gastropods described in 1791
Taxa named by Johann Friedrich Gmelin